Harry Maurice Roberts (born 21 July 1936) is an English career criminal and murderer who in 1966 instigated the Shepherd's Bush murders, in which three police officers were shot dead in London. The murders took place after plainclothes officers approached a Standard Vanguard estate car, in which Roberts and two other men were sitting in Braybrook Street near Wormwood Scrubs prison in London. Roberts feared the officers would discover firearms his gang were planning to use in a robbery. He killed two, while one of his accomplices shot dead the third.

After Roberts had spent nearly 48 years in prison, in 2014 the Parole Board for England and Wales approved his release, at the age of 78. Having far exceeded his minimum term of 30 years, he was one of the United Kingdom's longest-serving prisoners, having remained in custody since 1966. His release was controversial due to the nature of his crime.

Early life
Roberts was born in Wanstead, Essex, on 21 July 1936 where his parents ran The George public house. As a child he became involved in crime by helping his mother sell stolen goods on the black market. Roberts later described how the family owned a café in north London where his mother was "...selling on mostly food—tea and sugar—and sometimes ration books. Anything she could get her hands on".

In his late teens, he was sentenced to detention after using an iron bar to attack a shopkeeper during a robbery. Roberts served a 19-month sentence inside Gaynes Hall borstal, and was released in January 1956.

One week after leaving the borstal, Roberts was called up for national service and joined the Rifle Brigade (Prince Consort's Own), with whom he saw action during the Mau Mau uprising and Malayan Emergency. Of his service in the jungle he said that this was where he learned to kill and that he had "personally killed at least four". Roberts has claimed that he reached the rank of sergeant while in the Army although others have given his rank as lance corporal. Journalist and former armed robber John McVicar has said that Roberts "gloated" about his killings while in prison, and had "acquired a taste for killing prisoners [of war] on the orders of his officers" in the Army.

After leaving the Army, Roberts returned to his criminal activities, and in partnership with Jack Witney carried out "dozens" of armed robberies, targeting bookmakers, post offices and banks. He said, "The most I earned was £1,000 from a single job. Witney was the eldest, the boss: he knew the best places to rob. [John] Duddy joined us later." In 1959 Roberts and an accomplice posed as tax inspectors to gain entry into the home of an elderly man. The man was bound, robbed, and beaten about the head with a glass decanter. Roberts was arrested, and at his trial the judge, His Honour Judge Maude QC, said, "You are a brutal thug. You came very near the rope this time. It is to be hoped you do not appear before us again." Roberts received a sentence of seven years.

Shepherd's Bush murders

Following the shootings of 41-year-old Police Constable Geoffrey Fox, Detective Sergeant Christopher Head, aged 30, and 25-year-old Temporary Detective Constable David Wombwell in Shepherd's Bush, West London, to avoid capture Roberts used a tent to hide in Thorley Wood near Bishop's Stortford, Hertfordshire, until the winter set in and he moved inside farm buildings. He was familiar with the area from visits there as a child. A £1,000 reward was offered for information leading to his arrest. Roberts used his military training to evade capture for ninety-six days, but was finally caught by police while sleeping rough in a disused airfield hangar on Blount's Farm, Sawbridgeworth, near Bishop's Stortford in Hertfordshire.

Trial and imprisonment
Roberts was convicted of all three murders and sentenced to life imprisonment with a recommended minimum term of 30 years. The murders occurred just eight months after the Murder (Abolition of Death Penalty) Act 1965 suspended the death penalty in England, Wales and Scotland and substituted a mandatory sentence of life imprisonment. While in prison, Roberts made several attempts to escape.

In 2001, he was moved to an open prison. Roberts was returned to a closed prison within months after allegations that he was involved in drug dealing and contraband smuggling. Author Kate Kray, who interviewed Roberts for her book Natural Born Killers (1999), said that he has no remorse for his victims and recreates the murders in art and pastry decorations, making apple pies and decorating them with pastry cut-outs of policemen being shot. Kray said that he also produces "precisely drawn and coloured" paintings depicting someone shooting a policeman.

Appeals
In 2005 he failed in his appeal to the House of Lords over the use of secret evidence to keep him in prison. The evidence had been obtained by tapping private phone calls between Roberts and his solicitor. The material was then introduced as evidence at his parole hearings.

In September 2006, 70-year-old Roberts applied for a judicial review over apparent delays by the parole board in reaching a decision to free him by the end of the year. In December 2006, he was again turned down for parole. On 29 June 2007, he was given leave to seek a High Court judicial review over his failed parole bid, with the judge saying his case "was of great public interest."

It was reported in February 2009 that Roberts hoped to be freed from prison within months, having already served 42 years in jail and completing the first stage of a parole board hearing; he believed this would pave the way for his release. Roberts hoped a final hearing would find that at the age of 72 he was no longer a risk to the public and that the parole board would order his immediate release. At this time he had already served 12 years more than the minimum term recommended by his trial judge who at the time of sentencing told Roberts that it was unlikely that any future Home Secretary would "ever think fit to show mercy by releasing you on licence... This is one of those cases in which the sentence of imprisonment for 'life' may well be treated as meaning exactly what it says". It was recognised that government ministers were concerned that any decision on the matter would provoke public fury and that Roberts' safety might be put at risk but the parole board would nonetheless be powerless to halt the release.

Supporters of Roberts had previously claimed that successive Home Secretaries have blocked his release for political reasons because of fears of a public backlash. Peter Smyth, chairman of the Metropolitan Police Federation, said that there would be widespread anger among serving and former officers. Legal sources said they believed that the parole board was likely to recommend that he was eligible for an open prison as a way of preparing him for release. Jack Straw, the former Justice Secretary, retained the power to reject a parole board recommendation that Roberts be moved to an open prison but he could not block a decision by the board to order his release.

In April 2009, it was alleged by the owners of an animal sanctuary where Roberts was working on day release, that he made violent threats to them.

In October 2014 the Parole Board for England and Wales approved his release at an unspecified later date. Roberts was released on 11 November 2014 after serving 48 years in prison (from 15 November 1966).

Cultural impact
Roberts has become a cultural figure among anarchists and football hooligans, with the chant "Harry Roberts is our friend, is our friend, is our friend. Harry Roberts is our friend, he kills coppers. Let him out to kill some more, kill some more, kill some more, let him out to kill some more, Harry Roberts" as well as "He shot three down in Shepherd's Bush, Shepherd's Bush, Shepherd's Bush.  He shot three down in Shepherd's Bush, our mate Harry" (to the tune of "London Bridge Is Falling Down"), which originated with groups of young people outside Shepherd's Bush police station after Roberts had been arrested.

There have been artistic representations of Roberts. The character of Billy Porter in the 2001 novel He Kills Coppers by Jake Arnott, and the 2008 TV adaptation, is based on Roberts.

To the tune of the chant "Hare Krsna", in the song "Happiness Is Just a Chant Away" by Chumbawamba on their fifth studio album Shhh (1992), the words "Hare Krsna" are replaced with "Harry Roberts".

See also
List of longest prison sentences served

References 

1936 births
Living people
20th-century English criminals
British Army personnel of the Malayan Emergency
British people convicted of murdering police officers
British people convicted of robbery
Criminals from Essex
English male criminals
English people convicted of murder
English prisoners sentenced to life imprisonment
Male murderers
People convicted of murder by England and Wales
People from Wanstead
Prisoners sentenced to life imprisonment by England and Wales
Rifle Brigade soldiers
Royal Green Jackets soldiers